The Adelaide Film Festival (AFF, formerly ADLFF) is  film festival usually held for two weeks in mid-October in cinemas in Adelaide, South Australia. Originally presented biennially in March from 2003, since 2013 AFF has been held in October. Subject to funding, the festival has staged full or briefer events in alternating years; some form of event has taken place every year since 2015. From 2022 it takes place annually. It has a strong focus on local South Australian and Australian produced content, with the Adelaide Film Festival Investment Fund (AFFIF) established to fund investment in Australian films.

Established in 2003 as Adelaide International Film Festival, it dropped "International" from its title after the inaugural edition, as it dropped its FIAPF membership the following year. It was, however, the first film festival in Australia to introduce an international competition, as well as being the first to fund film production directly. 

The festival hosts a number of awards, including the Don Dunstan Awards (for lifetime contrtibution); Best Feature Fiction; Best Feature Documentary; Bettison & James Award; and others. In 2017 the International Virtual Reality Award was launched by AFF in partnership with the Australian Film, Television and Radio School (AFTRS), known as the AFTRS ADL Film Fest International VR Award. 

The 2020 Festival was scheduled to take place from 14 to 25 October, but owing to its high attendance figures and success, the season was extended for an extra five days. The 2022 festival runs from 19 to 31 October.

History

Overview
An independently financed Adelaide International Film Festival (AIFF) had been held from 1959 to 1980. The idea of a new film festival to stimulate the local film industry and celebrate the 30th anniversary of the South Australian Film Corporation was raised by Premier Mike Rann in 2002, and a director and board were appointed. The Adelaide Film Festival Investment Fund was created to fund the Film Festival and other events.

The inaugural Adelaide (International) Film Festival was held from 28 February to 3 March 2003. It ran a programme of screenings, special events and forums in a number of cinemas across Adelaide. It was the first film festival in Australia to introduce an international competition, and also the first to create an investment fund specifically for film production. 

After its first edition, the festival ceased to use "International" in its title, denoting a withdrawal from FIAPF membership. It was known as the BigPond Adelaide Film Festival, or BAFF, for a period until 2011, as its main sponsor had been BigPond.

 the festival had been held 11 times since, usually biennially but as an annual event from 2015 to 2018 (with occasional mini-events in intervening years). In 2022 it was announced that the full festival would be presented each year, instead of biennially, after the Malinauskas government pledged  annually for the following four years.

Festival directors
Katrina Sedgwick was the Festival's founding director in 2002. She had previously co-founded the 1995 Sydney Fringe Festival, was the Special Events Producer (1998, 2000) for the Adelaide Festival of Arts, and the artistic director for the 2002 Adelaide Fringe. In 2007, Sedgwick introduced an international jury prize to the festival. At the time of her stepping down from the role of Festival director in 2013, Sedgwick said that the festival was the first in Australia to introduce an international competition, and a production fund, and that ticket sales had grown by 20 per cent each year.

2013 was Amanda Duthie's first year as Festival Director, after spending eight years at the Australian Broadcasting Corporation and eight years at the Special Broadcasting Service during the 1990s.

After running the Festival’s programming from 2015-2018, Mat Kesting was appointed as the new CEO in 2019. Named as one of Screen International’s Future Leaders in 2019, Mat’s passion for cinema and strong curatorial voice is well known in the Australian film industry. Prior to this he was Exhibition Manager at the Mercury Cinema, programming special events including Cinémathèque, Silent ReMasters, and Seniors on Screen. He programmed six editions of the On Screen strand of OzAsia Festival, and was previously Program Manager at the Brisbane International Film Festival.

AFF events 
Since the first event in 2003, the Festival has been held (originally in odd-numbered years) in 2005, 2007, 2009, 2011, 2013, 2015, 2016 (a one-off "Rogue" event), 2017, 2018, and a "pop-up" weekend festival in March 2019.

The 2022 festival's audience and box office broke all previous records.

Locations
From 2017 to 2020, festival events took place mainly at the GU Filmhouse in Hindley Street (defunct as of 1 October 2020), with some sessions at the smaller Mercury Cinema in Morphett Street.

In 2020, most screenings were hosted by Palace Nova at their Eastend and Prospect locations, with some showings at Mitcham Wallis Cinemas at Mitcham Square Shopping Centre, Odeon Star in Semaphore, Tandanya, the Warriparinga Wetlands, and at Alberton Oval. In 2022, For the first time, screenings also took place at the Capri Theatre in Goodwood, Her Majesty's Theatre, and Event Cinemas Marion, in addition to the two Palace Nova locations, Wallis Mitcham, and Odeon Semaphore.

2022: 19−30 October
The 2022 edition of the festival is held from 19–30 October. Films selected for screening include Todd Field's TÁR (starring Cate Blanchett, who appeared in a Q&A session after its first showing); My Policeman, with Harry Styles; South Australian horror thriller Carnifex, with Alexandra Park; Ruben Östlund's Triangle of Sadness; Stolen Generations story The Last Daughter; and Aftersun, a debut from Scottish director Charlotte Wells. RackaRacka's debut, Talk to Me closed the festival. The Survival of Kindness by Rolf De Heer had red-carpet parties in the city. The new South Australian film Monolith had its world premiere at the festival on 27 October 2022. It was announced after the opening weekend that several films would get a second outing in the week following the festival, including TÁR, Monolith, Talk to Me, The Last Daughter, and Triangle of Sadness.

2020: 14−30 October
In 2020 the Adelaide Film Festival was scheduled to run from 14 to 25 October, one of the few events of its type during the worldwide COVID-19 pandemic, but due to the success of the festival, an extended run of selected films was scheduled as part of the Best of the Fest programme, re-showing ten of the programmed films from 26 to 30 October.

To open the festival, the  locally filmed sci-fi thriller 2067  played in seven cinemas simultaneously, with extra screenings added due to demand. One of the headlining films was I Am Woman, starring Adelaide actor Tilda Cobham-Hervey, who returned from Los Angeles in September. Other films included the documentary The Painter and the Thief, and High Ground, and the films include 22 world premieres, 27 Australian premieres and a total of 54 feature films from many countries.

The competition jury comprises playwright and screenwriter Andrew Bovell, actor Natasha Wanganeen, filmmaker Khoa Do, producer Rebecca Summerton of Closer Productions and film critic Zak Hepburn.

The earliest screening at the festival took place on 22 August, with several early showings of I Am Woman; the final event, a documentary about Port Adelaide Football Club called This is Port Adelaide, premiered at Odeon Star Semaphore from 5–7 February 2021.

2019: 5–7 April "pop-up"
In April 2019, a weekend "pop-up" event was held, to showcase Wayne Blair's romcom, Top End Wedding, and Adelaide filmmaker Sophie Hyde's Australian/Irish co-production Animals.

2018: 10–21 October 
In April 2017, the Premier Jay Weatherill announced that a full festival, including new funding of A$1m for the ADL Film Fest Fund, would run again in October 2018.

Hotel Mumbai, Can You Ever Forgive Me?, rock documentary Bad Reputation (about Joan Jett) and The Nightingale (directed by Babadook director Jennifer Kent) were some of the films shown.

2017: 5–15 October 
At the 2017 festival, the theme "Vive le Punk" celebrated the punk movement's 40th anniversary. It featured A Fantastic Woman, Call Me By Your Name, a set by Adelaide punk band Exploding White Mice and Ai Weiwei's documentary about migration, Human Flow.

2016: 27–30 October  
Having previously been held biennially, the highlight of "AFF Goes Rogue" in October 2016 was a 4-day "mini-festival" in the in-between year. The first of the works commissioned by the Adelaide Film Festival Fund in that month was the Australian premiere season of Lynette Wallworth's  Collisions (5–30 October). Then there was a free talk by Greg Mackie at the Adelaide Festival of Ideas on 23 October, and the events culminated in a 4-day mini-festival (27–30 October) featuring world premiere screenings of two films – Australia's first Muslim rom-com Ali's Wedding, based on the life of actor, writer and comedian Osamah Sami, and a special "work in progress" screening of David Stratton's Stories of Australian Cinema, directed by Sally Aitken (later released as David Stratton: A Cinematic Life). Other films shown were Gimme Danger, a documentary film about the Stooges, and a retrospective screening of Lucky Miles (2007).

2015: 15–25 October 

The 7th Adelaide Film Festival was held from 15 to 25 October 2015. Amanda Duthie was again the Festival Director. On the opening night of the festival, director and screenwriter Andrew Bovell received the 2015 Don Dunstan Award for his contribution to the Australian film industry.

The festival opened with Scott Hicks's documentary film Highly Strung, and closed with Paolo Sorrentino's drama film Youth.

More than 180 feature films were screened at the festival, 40 of which were Australian films, 24 South Australian films and total of 51 countries were represented at the Festival.

As part of the 2015 Adelaide Film Festival, a public art installation was presented, incorporating a Laneway Cinema in Cinema Place, showing moving image artworks, and a 'Reactive Wall', where six artists created 2D visual artworks live in response to content within the festival.

2013: 10–20 October 

The 6th Adelaide Film Festival took place from 10 to 20 October 2013. This was Amanda Duthie's first year as Festival Director (after eight years at the Australian Broadcasting Corporation and eight years at the Special Broadcasting Service during the 1990s), having taken over from Katrina Sedgwick. Margaret Pomeranz and David Stratton served as the festival's patrons.

Scott Hicks received the 2013 Don Dunstan Award for his contribution to the Australian film industry.

The poster in 2013 depicted Screen Worship, which celebrates work for all screens—cinema, television, phone and computer.

Patrons and board
Well-known film critics Margaret Pomeranz and David Stratton are patrons of the AFF.

The board of the Adelaide Film Festival  consisted of:

 Chair Anton Andreacchio, producer and entrepreneur, board member of the South Australian Film Corporation and Entrepreneurship Advisory Board
Hugo Weaving, actor
 Martha Coleman, a producer of film and television, a former head of development at Screen Australia, and as of 2020 heading production company Revlover
Joshua Fanning, an experienced company director and entrepreneur. Founder of CityMag, currently the Group Creative Director for KWP!
Marianna Panopoulos, a certified practising accountant and a graduate of the Australian Institute of Company Directors 
Beck Cole, a prominent Aboriginal screen writer and director of drama and documentaries

Former Board members include Cheryl Bart, Sandra Sdraulig, Andrew Bovell, Judith Crombie, Mojgan Khadem, Gabrielle Kelly, Wayne Lewis, Barry Loane, Sue Maslin, Jacinta Thompson, Leanne Thomas Sam White, Greg Knagge and Jamie Restas.

Recognition
In 2007, the AFF featured in Variety Magazine's Top 50 unmissable film festivals, around the world. saying: "Of the planet’s 1,000-plus film fests, only a select few pack industry impact. A few dozen more, by virtue of vision, originality, striking setting, audience zest and/or their ability to mine a unique niche, also rank as must-attends".

The Adelaide Film Festival's 2020 event was awarded "Best Festival" at the 2021 South Australian Ruby Awards, an annual ceremony which recognises outstanding achievement in South Australia’s arts and culture sector.

Awards

Don Dunstan Award
The Don Dunstan Award was established in honour of Don Dunstan, Premier of South Australia through most of the 1970s, and is presented in recognition of an outstanding contribution to the Australian film industry by an individual.

Past recipients have included:
2003 - David Gulpilil, actor
2005 - Dennis O'Rourke, cinematographer and documentary filmmaker
2007 – Rolf de Heer, director
2009 – Jan Chapman, producer
2011 – Judy Davis, actor
2013 – Scott Hicks, director
2015 – Andrew Bovell, screenwriter and playwright
2017 – Margaret Pomeranz & David Stratton, film critics
2018 – Freda Glynn, pioneering Indigenous filmmaker, and her family members involved in the film industry: offspring Erica Glynn and Warwick Thornton, and grandchildren Tanith Glynn-Maloney and Dylan River 
2020 – Bruna Papandrea, producer
2022 – David Jowsey, producer, of Bunya Productions

Feature Fiction Award
ADL Film Fest was the first Australian film festival to create a juried prize for best feature film.

Winners have included:
2006 Still Life (Jia Zhangke, China)
2009 Treeless Mountain (So Yong Kim (USA/South Korea)
2011 Incendies (Denis Villeneuve, Canada/France)
2013 Jîn (Reha Erdem, Turkey)
2015 Neon Bull (Gabriel Mascaro, Brazil)
2017 I Am Not a Witch (Rungano Nyoni, France/United Kingdom)
2019 The Seen and Unseen (Kamila Andini, Indonesia/Netherlands/Australia)
2020 Beginning (Déa Kulumbegashvili, Georgia)
2022 Autobiography (Indonesia)

Feature Documentary Award
The Feature Documentary Award, also known as the Flinders University International Documentary Award, was first awarded in 2013, with the inaugural prize goingto Blush of Fruit (Australia, Vietnam), directed by Jakeb Anhvu.  Since then it has been won by:

2015 Speed Sisters (Amber Fares)
2017 Taste of Cement (Ziad Kalthoum)
2018 Island of the Hungry Ghosts (Gabrielle Brady)
2020 Firestarter – The Story of Bangarra (Nel Minchin and Wayne Blair; about the Bangarra Dance Theatre)
2022 The Hamlet Syndrome (set shortly before Russia's invasion of Ukraine)

Bettison & James Award

The Bettison & James Award, formerly Jim Bettison and Helen James Award, presented in collaboration with the Jim Bettison and Helen James Foundation, was established to recognise Australians who "have contributed exemplary and inspiring lifelong body of work of high achievement and benefit; and that the completion, extension, recording and/or dissemination of such work would have benefits for both the individual concerned and for the wider Australian community". The foundation was established by the estates of the Jim Bettison and his partner Helen James. Bettison created the Developed Image Photographic Gallery, co-founded communications company Codan and served as Deputy Chancellor of the University of Adelaide, his alma mater (an honorary position). Helen was an exhibiting studio artist, who served on a number of arts committees and was one of the founding members of the National Library of Australia’s Foundation Board.
2015: Greg Mackie , founder of the Adelaide Festival of Ideas
2016: Meryl Tankard , dancer, choreographer and director; and 
Tim Jarvis, adventurer and environmental scientist
2017: Robert McFarlane, social documentary and arts photographer
2018: Jackie Huggins , author, historian and Indigenous rights advocate, for researching the social impacts of Aboriginal soldiers going to fight in both World Wars.
2019: John Long, paleontologist, academic and author of popular science non-fiction and fiction.
2020: David Vaux, scientist and expert on cell death, 2019 co-recipient of the Florey Medal for Lifetime Achievement
2021: Bob Brown, environmentalist, human rights campaigner and former political leader of the Australian Greens party.
2022: Pat Rix, artistic director

Change Award
The Change Award was established in 2020. Worth  and sponsored by Zambrero, it is awarded "for positive social or environmental impact and cinema expressing new directions for humanity", selected by audience vote.
2020:  
2022: Luku Ngarra, directed by Sinem Saban and produced by Djiniyini Gondarra  and Saban, about the history and culture of Arnhem Land

Flinders University Short Film Prize
Established in 2022, this award is determined by audience vote.
2022: Are You Really the Universe, directed by Tamara Hardman and starring Tilda Cobham-Hervey

INSITE Award
The Adelaide Film Festival teamed up with the Australian Writers' Guild to present the INSITE Award at the 2013 Festival. The Award celebrates and acknowledges outstanding work produced by AWG screenwriters and provides an important development opportunity for both writers and the industry. The winner gets to meet industry directors and producers, with a view to moving the project onto the screen.

It has not been awarded since 2017 and is not mentioned on the 2020 list of awards. Past winners have included:
 2003 Cut Snake, by Blake Ayshford, was filmed by director Tony Ayres.
 2005 Moving South, by Cath Moore.
 2007 Salt, by Priscilla Cameron and Heather Phillips, was directed by Michael Angus in 2009. The film played at the Adelaide Film Festival that same year.
 2009 Writing Rain, written by Ben Chessell.
 2011 The Unlikeliest Hero, by Barbara Connell, was planned to be filmed by New Zealand director James Cunningham in an official Australia/New Zealand co-production, with completion of the film timed to coincide with the 100-year commemorations of Anzac Day. (However,  it was last reported as being pitched as an animated film at the Annecy International Animation Film Festival in 2015.)
2013 Tigress, written by Jane Hampson.
2015 Martingale, written by Harry Aletras.
2017 Petrova, written by Bec Peniston-Bird.

AFTRS International VR Award
In 2017, ADL Film Fest introduced the AFTRS ADL Film Fest International VR Award, the first competition of its kind in Australia, in collaboration with the Australian Film, Television and Radio School (AFTRS). Nothing Happens, by Michelle and Uri Kranot, won the inaugural award, while The Other Dakar by Selly Raby, based on Senegalese mythology, received a Special Mention.

In 2018, The Unknown Patient, by Australian director Michael Beets won the award.

Indigenous Feature Documentary Initiative
The award provided funding for an established Indigenous film-maker to make a feature-length documentary, providing funding for the director and a producer.

Eualeyai/Kamillaroi writer and academic Larissa Behrendt, along with Michaela Perske, writer and producer, were awarded the funding in 2016 to work on their feature documentary project, After the Apology.

On 9 October 2017, AFF held the world première of the resulting film, and it was sold out at the Winda Film Festival in Sydney in November of that year. The film focuses on a group of grandmothers (Grandmothers Against Removals) taking on the system over the increase in Indigenous child removal in the years following Kevin Rudd's Apology to Australia's Indigenous peoples, in which he offered an apology on behalf of the Australian Government to the Stolen Generations resulting from historic child removal policies in Australia. It won Best Direction of a Documentary Feature Film from the Australian Directors Guild in 2018, and was nominated in three categories in the 2018 AACTA Awards: Best Direction in Nonfiction Television (Larissa Behrendt); Best Documentary or Factual Program (Michaela Perske); and Best Original Music Score in A Documentary (Caitlin Yeo).

Juries
Jury members for the International Feature Film Prize have included Afghani actor Leena Alam and Portuguese filmmaker João Pedro Rodrigues (2017); Palestinian filmmaker Annemarie Jacir and Adelaide filmmaker Sophie Hyde (2015); actor/filmmaker Wayne Blair and writer Lawrence Weschler ( 2013); Hossein Valamanesh (2011); JM Coetzee (2007 & 2009), Naomi Kawase and David Stratton (2009); Margaret Pomeranz and Ana Kokkinos (2007).

Jury members for the Flinders University Documentary Prize have included Eva Orner (2017); Beck Cole (2015) and Michael Loebenstein (2015).

Amanda Duthie, AFF artistic director and virtual reality champion, sat on the jury for the inaugural AFTRS International VR Award in 2017.

The jury for the 2020 Feature Fiction and Documentary awards were Andrew Bovell, Khoa Do, Zak Hepburn, Rebecca Summerton (of Closer Productions), and Natasha Wanganeen.

Film Lab: New Voices
In 2021 the Film Lab: New Voices initiative was launched by the South Australian Film Corporation and the AFF, in collaboration with Mercury CX. This program supports emerging filmmakers, with three teams selected for mentoring over an 11-month development period and one team then selected for funding to complete a low-budget feature film which is premiered at the next AFF.

References

External links

 
2002 establishments in Australia
Film festivals established in 2002
October events
Australian film awards
Annual events in Australia
Film festivals in Adelaide